The Uele (Üöle) is a river in Yakutia (Sakha Republic), Russia. The river basin is a desolate area devoid of human settlements.

Course  
The Uele has its sources near lake Sobaka-Lakh in the North Siberian Lowland. The river flows roughly northwestwards in a winding channel across a floodplain with numerous lakes. Finally it enters the eastern side of the inner Anabar Bay just east of the mouth of the Anabar.

Tributaries 
Its main tributaries are the Kraynyaya, Bayan, Darkylakh, Onkuchakh-Yuryakh and Salga from the right, as well as the Khatygyn-Uelete, Byorolyokh-Ayan and Sasyr-Tyobyulekh from the left.

Fauna
The Uele is frozen most of the year. It stays under ice between the end of September/beginning of October and the end of May/beginning of June. The river is an important habitat for nelma, as recorded in the Red Data Book of the Russian Federation.

See also
List of rivers of Russia

References

External links 
Fishing & Tourism in Yakutia

Rivers of the Sakha Republic
North Siberian Lowland